Peptidyl-L-lysine(-L-arginine) hydrolase may refer to:
 Lysine carboxypeptidase, an enzyme
 Carboxypeptidase E, an enzyme